High on You is the debut studio album by Surinamese singer-songwriter Jeangu Macrooy. It was released on 14 April 2017 by Unexpected Records. The album includes the singles "Step Into the Water", "Crazy Kids", "High On You" and "Tell Me Father". The album peaked at number 69 on the Dutch Albums Chart. In 2018, it was nominated for Best Album at the Edison Awards.

Singles
"Step Into the Water" was released as the lead single from the album on 1 March 2017. "Crazy Kids" was released as the second single from the album on 17 May 2017. "High On You" was released as the third single from the album on 4 September 2017. "Tell Me Father" was released as the fourth and final single from the album on 30 November 2017.

Track listing

Charts

Release history

References

2017 albums